Rail transport in Hungary is mainly owned by the national rail company MÁV, with a significant portion of the network owned and operated by GySEV.

Hungary is a member of the International Union of Railways (UIC). The UIC country code for Hungary is 55.

Statistics 
 Railway lines total: 
 Standard gauge: 
 Broad gauge:  of 
 Narrow gauge: 

Note: The standard and broad gauge railways are operated by the State Railways and also the following narrow gauge railways: Nyíregyháza–Balsai Tisza part/Dombrád; Balatonfenyves–Somogyszentpál; Kecskemét–Kiskunmajsa/Kiskőrös and the Children's Railway in Budapest. All the other narrow gauge railways are run by State Forest companies or local non-profit organisations. See also Narrow gauge railways in Hungary.

Financial performance and corporate statistics 
 Revenue = 372,549 million Ft (2014)
 Net income = 22,851 million Ft (2014)
 Number of employees = 38,456 (2009)
 Owner = Hungarian state (100% state ownership)

Rail links to adjacent countries 
Same gauge:
 Austria — voltage change 25 kV AC / 15 kV AC
 Slovenia — voltage change 25 kV AC / 3 kV DC
 Croatia — same voltage 25 kV AC
 Serbia — same voltage 25 kV AC
 Romania — same voltage 25 kV AC
 Slovakia — same voltage 25 kV AC (west) and 3 kV DC (east)

Break-of-gauge (:
 Ukraine — no electrified rail link

Modern and historical railway maps

Urban rail

Commuter 
The biggest agglomeration of Hungary has a suburban rail system:

Metro 
The biggest city of Hungary has a Metro system:

Tram 
There are also several tram systems in many cities, listed as follows:

See also 

 List of railway lines in Hungary
 Transport in Hungary
 Hungarian State Railways

References

External links 
 Hungarian State Railway